Servani is a village in the municipality of Bugojno, Bosnia and Herzegovina. It is located 47 miles (76 Kilometers) northwest of the capital, Sarajevo.

Demographics 
According to the 2013 census, its population was 7, all Bosniaks.

References

Populated places in Bugojno